In the theory of probability and statistics, the Dvoretzky–Kiefer–Wolfowitz–Massart inequality (DKW inequality) bounds how close an empirically determined distribution function will be to the distribution function from which the empirical samples are drawn. It is named after Aryeh Dvoretzky, Jack Kiefer, and Jacob Wolfowitz, who in 1956 proved the inequality
 

with an unspecified multiplicative constant C in front of the exponent on the right-hand side. 

In 1990, Pascal Massart proved the inequality with the sharp constant C = 2, confirming a conjecture due to Birnbaum and McCarty. In 2021, Michael Naaman proved the multivariate version of the DKW inequality and generalized Massart's tightness result to the multivariate case, which results in a sharp constant of twice the dimension k of the space in which the observations are found: C = 2k.

The DKW inequality
Given a natural number n, let X1, X2, …, Xn be real-valued independent and identically distributed random variables with cumulative distribution function F(·).  Let Fn denote the associated empirical distribution function defined by
 

The Dvoretzky–Kiefer–Wolfowitz inequality bounds the probability that the random function Fn differs from F by more than a given constant ε > 0 anywhere on the real line. More precisely, there is the one-sided estimate
 

which also implies a two-sided estimate
 

This strengthens the Glivenko–Cantelli theorem by quantifying the rate of convergence as n tends to infinity. It also estimates the tail probability of the Kolmogorov–Smirnov statistic. The inequalities above follow from the case where F corresponds to be the uniform distribution on [0,1] in view of the fact
that Fn has the same distributions as Gn(F) where Gn is the empirical distribution of
U1, U2, …, Un where these are independent and Uniform(0,1), and noting that
 
with equality if and only if F is continuous.

Multivariate case 
In the multivariate case, X1, X2, …, Xn is an i.i.d. sequence of k-dimensional vectors. If Fn is the multivariate empirical cdf, then 

 
for every ε, n, k > 0. The (n + 1) term can be replaced with a 2 for any sufficiently large n.

Kaplan–Meier estimator 
The Dvoretzky–Kiefer–Wolfowitz inequality is obtained for the Kaplan–Meier estimator which is a right-censored data analog of the empirical distribution function

 

Building CDF bands

The Dvoretzky–Kiefer–Wolfowitz inequality is one method for generating CDF-based confidence bounds and producing a confidence band, which is sometimes called the Kolmogorov–Smirnov confidence band. The purpose of this confidence interval is to contain the entire CDF at the specified confidence level, while alternative approaches attempt to only achieve the confidence level on each individual point, which can allow for a tighter bound. The DKW bounds runs parallel to, and is equally above and below, the empirical CDF. The equally spaced confidence interval around the empirical CDF allows for different rates of violations across the support of the distribution. In particular, it is more common for a CDF to be outside of the CDF bound estimated using the DKW inequality near the median of the distribution than near the endpoints of the distribution. 

The interval that contains the true CDF, with probability  is often specified as

 

which is also a special case of the asymptotic procedure for the multivariate case, whereby one uses the following critical value 
 
for the multivariate test; one may replace 2k with k(n + 1) for a test that holds for all n; moreover, the multivariate test described by Naaman can be generalized to account for heterogeneity and dependence.

See also
 Concentration inequality – a summary of bounds on sets of random variables.

References

Asymptotic theory (statistics)
Statistical inequalities
Empirical process